Hertwig is a German surname. Notable people with the surname include:

Benjamin Hertwig, Canadian poet
Craig Hertwig (1952–2012), American football player
Michael Hertwig (born 1960), German football player and manager
Oscar Hertwig (1849–1922), German zoologist
Paula Hertwig (1889–1983), German biologist, politician
Richard Hertwig (1850–1937), German zoologist

See also
Hertwig's sheath, a proliferation of epithelial cells

German-language surnames